Islallana is a village in the municipality of Nalda, in the province and autonomous community of La Rioja, Spain. As of 2018 had a population of 122 people. It is located next to the Iregua river, in the foothills of the Sistem Iberico mountain range.

References

Populated places in La Rioja (Spain)